Perivola (Greek: Περιβόλα) may refer to:

Perivola, Patras, a neighborhood in southeastern Patras
Perivola A.O., a football (soccer) club in Patras

See also

Perivolia (disambiguation)